Sofidel is an Italian multinational producer of tissue paper for sanitary and domestic use.
The Sofidel Group was founded in 1966. It is one of the world leaders in the tissue paper market and the second largest producer in Europe behind Essity. The privately held company is owned by the Stefani and Lazzareschi families, has subsidiaries in 13 countries and more than 6,600 employees.

Timeline
In 2010, Sofidel's production capacity totaled 940,000 tons, in 2015 the number rose to 1,050,000 tons per year.

In 2008, Sofidel joined the WWF as a member and the first Italian manufacturer and the first company in the world from the tissue sector. Over the years, the partnership has led to several joint marketing and communications projects.

In 2015, it announced multiple US investments, being the first Italian tissue company to make it into the US market.

In 2016, it was announced that 100% of Sofidel tissue products in Western Europe will bear the FSC label.

In 2017, Sofidel is present in 7 states in the US, where it has a production capacity of 200,000 tons. 

In October 2018, the Group's largest, most modern and sustainable production facility opened in Circleville, Ohio.

In 2021 the Shareholders' Meeting, appointed the new board of directors in which directors from outside the Stefani and Lazzareschi families join for the first time: Chiara Mio, Silvio Bianchi Martini, Andrea Munari and Alessandro Solidoro. 

In March 2021 Edilio Stefani succeeds his father, Emi Stefani, as chairman of Sofidel.

Business
Internally, the Sofidel Group realizes an integrated cycle from the production of tissue reels to their conversion into finished products, feeding four business lines: consumer Brand, private label (distributor brand), away-fromHome (AFH), parent reels (semi-finished products: reels for paper companies).

Partnership 
In 2008 Sofidel became a partner in WWF's international Climate Savers program.
In the same year it joins the United Nations Global Compact, supporting environmental sustainability projects. 
To date, the Group has ongoing collaborations with influential partners: in addition to institutional ones (WWF, Ocean Conservancy, EU-OSHA - European Agency for Safety and Health at Work, UN Global Compact Network Italy) it has important synergies through its brands and products.

Sustainability
The Sofidel Group considers sustainability a strategic growth factor and is committed to reducing impacts on the environment while striving to create added value for all its stakeholders. Sofidel's greenhouse gas emission reduction targets to 2030 have been recognized by Science Based Targets initiative (SBTi) to be in line with the levels required to limit global warming well below 2°C, as required by the Paris Agreement. Sofidel was the first Italian manufacturing company, and the first in the world in the tissue sector, to join the WWF Climate Savers program, aimed at leading companies on the low-carbon economy front.

References

External links
Official Website

Pulp and paper companies of Italy
Italian companies established in 1966
Italian brands